葵涌 may refer to:
Kwai Chung, an area in the New Territories, Hong Kong
Kuichong Subdistrict, a subdistrict of Shenzhen, China